James Mein (1 July 1852 – 2 March 1918) was a Scottish international rugby union player who played for Edinburgh Academicals in Edinburgh.

Mein played as a Forward.

Mein was capped 5 times for Scotland. His debut came in the very first international match in 1871 playing against England at Raeburn Place, Edinburgh. His last test was in the 1875 Home Nations match playing against England at Raeburn Place.

Mein was capped by Edinburgh District. He appeared in the world's first non-international representative match in 1871; the 'inter-city', the inter-district match between Edinburgh District and Glasgow District

References

1852 births
1918 deaths
Edinburgh Academicals rugby union players
Edinburgh District (rugby union) players
Rugby union players from Jedburgh
Scotland international rugby union players
Scottish rugby union players
Rugby union forwards